Manolo Fortich, officially the Municipality of Manolo Fortich (Bukid and Higaonon: Banuwa ta Manolo Fortich;), is a 1st class municipality in the province of Bukidnon, Philippines. According to the 2020 census, it has a population of 113,200 people.

Manolo Fortich used to be known as Maluko; it was renamed in 1957. Maluko also happens to be the name of one of the municipality's barangay.

History
Before the coming of the Spaniards, the term "Bukidnon" referred to as the semi-sedentary indigenous inhabitants of the high plateaus and rugged mountain ranges of central Mindanao. The more prominent of these peoples were the "Manobos" who were the earliest settlers of this region. Located on the northern part of Bukidnon, is the Municipality of Manolo Fortich.

The great pre-historic Asiatic migration was believed to have brought the early settlers of Bukidnon. It was theorized that they came from places of what is now known as Indonesia. Traveling by the sea, these migrants reached the gulf of Davao where some ventured further to areas of what is now known as Bukidnon and Misamis Oriental. The Asiatic beginnings of these people can be seen from their oral tradition and folktales, like the "Kalikat Hu Mga Elaw Dini Ta Mindanao" (Origin of the People of Mindanao). This folktale revolved on the story of two brothers from Asia "who crossed the seas" in their long journey "towards the east" which refers to the islands of the Philippines. The brothers reportedly landed in the island of Mindanao. With the region experiencing a drought, one of the brothers was forced to venture Northward in order to survive. He did this by following a dried up river to its almost dried up source, a lake. He settled and inter-married with the local inhabitants in the upstream of what is now known as Pulangi River. He and his family were considered as the ancestors of the present Bukidnons.

During the pre-historic era, the Bukidnons, also called Monteses or mountain-people, had settled in the area of what is now the Province of Bukidnon. These people have remained traditional till 1860 preserving most of their customs and traditions. Furthermore, these people had not been significantly influenced by the Spanish colonizers because of their isolation. The rugged mountain ranges and high plateaus which serve as home to these people presented an overwhelming obstacle to these colonizers. The Bukidnons undoubtedly have links to the culture predominant in the Southeast Asian region as evidenced by the similar customs and traditions. Their presence here can be traced to the early migration of these Asians throughout the region. Today, the surviving tribes inhabiting the mountains of Bukidnon still bear the culture they have inherited from their ancestors.

Manolo Fortich is named after Don Manuel "Manolo" González Fortich, a provincial resident of Barrio Damilag who became the first governor (1907-1914) of the Sub-province of Bukidnon. Don Manuel Fortich was born on November 27, 1879 in San Nicolas (now Barangay Basak San Nicolas), Cebu City. A Philippine Constabulary officer, he served as a guide to Dean C. Worcester while on expedition to Bukidnon. Upon retirement from government service in 1920, he established ranches in Maluko and Maramag, and acquired 3,000 cows. He died on January 15, 1943 at the age of 64.

The original name of the town was Maluko, and was headed by Santiago Mambinonsad who was appointed as Alcalde de Barrio from 1922 to 1924. It was during the term of Ciriaco Asilan as Presidente del Barrio from 1926 to 1928, that the seat of municipal government was permanently transferred to Tangkulan. Mateo Gumaling was the first appointed municipal mayor of Maluko and in 1940 Margarito Cabang became the first elected Mayor.

World War II 
Manolo Fortich was captured by Japanese forces of the Kawamura Detachment of the IJA 5th Division attacking from Cagayan on May 6, 1942. They advance further eastward two days later.

Post-war 
Maluko was then renamed to Manolo Fortich by virtue of Republic Act No. 1720 on June 21, 1957.

Cityhood

On August 16, 2018, Representative Maria Lourdes Acosta-Alba of Bukidnon's First District filed House Bill 8115, which aims for the cityhood of Manolo Fortich as a component city.

Another House Bill No. 8283 was filed last December 21, 2020, for the conversion of the municipality of Manolo Fortich into a component city in the province of Bukidnon. The bill is currently pending with the committee on local government since January 18, 2021. Senator Juan Miguel Zubiri introduced Senate Bill No. 2038 for the conversion of the municipality in the Senate, pending in the committee since February 8, 2021.

Geography

Manolo Fortich is situated in the northern part of the province of Bukidnon. It is about 40 minutes away from the bustling commercial center of Cagayan de Oro.

It is bounded in the north by Cagayan de Oro and the municipality of Malitbog. In the east by the municipality of Sumilao, in the west by the municipality of Libona and Baungon and in the south by the rugged ranges of Mount Kitanglad.

Climate

The climate is classified as belonging to type IV or Intermediate. Its temperature is relatively cool and humid making the place suitable for production of any kind of crops. Production of high valued crops, which include vegetables, cut flowers and ornamentals is a big potential in the area.

Barangays

Manolo Fortich is politically subdivided into 22 barangays.

Demographics

In the 2010 census, the population of the municipality was 91,026 people, up from 82,051 in 2007. Manolo Fortich belongs to a very low-density area which has only approximately 162 persons per square kilometre. The urban population is confined in barangays Agusan Canyon, Damilag and Tankulan.

Ethnic origin
There are three major ethnic groups in Manolo Fortich and they are the Higaonon, Talaandig and the Cebuano-Bohol ethnic groups. the latter were mostly migrants from Cebu and Bohol who came to work as agricultural laborers in the plantation and orchard farms of the highland plateau, about 55% of the residents are Higaonons who are indigenous people in the area.

Languages
Cebuano, a Visayan language, is the major spoken language of the town. In the upland barangay plateau areas of Dahilayan, Guilang-guilang, Kalugmanan, Santiago and Ticala, the Higa-onons and Talaandigs speak their indigenous language called "Binukid".

Economy

While Del Monte Philippines' manufacturing plant is located in nearby Cagayan de Oro, yet its pineapple plantation is located in the municipality specifically in Camp Phillips Road, Barangay Agusan Canyon while the company's clubhouse is located at Barangay San Miguel, still in Camp Phillips Road. The Del Monte Golf Course & Country Club on the other hand is located in Sitio Cawayanon, Barangay San Miguel. Just a few meters from the golf course is the Del Monte School, still located in Sitio Cawayanon. The Cawayanon Compound also located in Sitio Cawayanon is a residential area mostly inhabited by Del Monte employees.

Infrastructure

Water/drainage systems
Manolo Fortich has three major river systems crisscrossing the upstream and downstream agricultural lands. These are the Tagoloan, Mangima and Agusan Rivers, which serve as natural boundaries and drainage of excess water and run-off from around the municipality. The other rivers of the municipality are, among others: Dicklum, Kumaykay, Guihian, Tasaon and Kulaman Rivers. The river systems also serve as sources of potable water supply for domestic use. About 26 creeks spread across nine barangays in the municipality.

Natural resources

Forests
Forest areas in Manolo Fortich are found in two barangays along the Mt. Kitanglad Range. Mt. Kitanglad hosts a diverse species of flora and fauna, many of them rare and endemic, making it a potential for tourism and bio-diversity research.

Minerals
The major metallic mineral found in the municipality is chromite and the non-metallic includes semi-precious stones. Also available are clay, limestone, feldspar, silica quartz and schist.

See also
List of renamed cities and municipalities in the Philippines

References

External links

 
 [ Philippine Standard Geographic Code]
Philippine Census Information
Old Official Website of Manolo Fortich

Municipalities of Bukidnon